The production of beer in New Jersey has been in a state of recovery since Prohibition (1919-1933) and the Great Depression (1929-1945).  Currently, the state has 123 licensed breweries: a large production brewery owned by an international beverage company, Anheuser-Busch InBev, and 122 independent microbreweries and 19 brewpubs.  The growth of the microbreweries and brewpubs since the 1990s has been aided by the loosening of the state's licensing restrictions and strict alcohol control laws, many of which were a legacy of Prohibition.

History
 
The first brewery in New Jersey was established in a fledgling settlement of Pavonia in what is now Hoboken when the state was part the Dutch New Netherland colony. It was short-lived and destroyed by a band of Lenape in 1643 during Governor Kieft's War (1643-1645).  Large German immigrant populations in Newark and Jersey City led to the establishment of a healthy brewing industry in the nineteenth and early twentieth centuries. Brewing beer became the fourth-largest industry in Newark, and names like Kruger, Hensler, and Feigenspan were among the leading industrial families in Newark.

Later, regional (and later national) brands Ballantine, and Rheingold, and Pabst, among others operated large breweries in Newark and surrounding towns.  With accusations of German propaganda and persecution of German-Americans during World War I, many of the state's brewers relocated to the American midwest. Prohibition closed many of the remaining breweries in the state.  For instance, of Newark's 27 breweries before Prohibition, none of them exist today.  As the industry reorganized and consolidated in the 1970s and 1980s to compete nationally, brewers like Ballantine (in the 1960s), Rheingold (1977), and Pabst (1985) closed their doors.

One of the nation's first modern craft breweries was Vernon Valley Brewery, which was opened in 1985 by Gene Mulvihill, in the old Action Park amusement park. .  The brewery closed in 1992.
  
Presently, the state is home to one large-production brewery, Anheuser-Busch in Newark, which opened in 1951 and is used for brewing Budweiser and Rolling Rock.  New Jersey offers a limited brewery license for microbreweries and a restricted brewery license for brewpubs that has allowed the industry to grow in recent years.  In 1995, the Ship Inn Restaurant and Brewery in Milford became the first brewpub in New Jersey. In 1996, David Hoffman opened what is the oldest of the current craft microbreweries in the state called Climax Brewing in Roselle Park, then followed shortly afterward by High Point Brewing. In 2016, New Jersey craft brewers produced 111,416 barrels of craft brew. In 2012, New Jersey liberalized its licensing laws to allow microbreweries to sell beer by the glass as part of a tour, and sell up to 15.5 gallons (i.e., a keg) for off-premises consumption.  The same legislation permits brewpubs to brew up to 10,000 barrels of beer per year, and sell to wholesalers and at festivals.

Brewery licenses and regulation
Breweries in the state of New Jersey must obtain licenses from the Alcohol and Tobacco Tax and Trade Bureau (TTB) of the U.S. Department of the Treasury, and from the New Jersey Division of Alcoholic Beverage Control. New Jersey taxes beer at a rate of 12 cents per gallon.

New Jersey Class A manufacturer's licenses for breweries

See also

 Alcohol laws of New Jersey
 Beer in the United States
 List of wineries, breweries, and distilleries in New Jersey
 New Jersey distilled spirits
 New Jersey Division of Alcoholic Beverage Control
 New Jersey wine

References

Further reading 
 Morris, Chris. "North Jersey Beer: A Brewing History from Princeton to Sparta", Charleston, S.C.: Arcadia Publishing, 2015. 
 Bryson, Lew and Mark Haynie. "New Jersey Breweries", Mechanicsburg, PA: Stackpole Books, 2008. .
 Pellegrino, Michael. "Jersey Brew, The Story of Beer in New Jersey",  Wantage, NJ: Lake Neepaulin Publishing, 2009. .

External links
 Garden State Craft Brewers Guild
 New Jersey Division of Alcoholic Beverage Control